Christina Holguín (born 25 July 1996) is an American-born Mexican footballer who plays as a goalkeeper who plays for Liga MX Femenil club FC Juárez.

Early life
Holguín was born in Los Angeles, California to Mexican parents. She was raised in nearby Alhambra.

Amateur career
Holguín attended San Francisco State University and was the starting goalkeeper for the San Francisco State Gators soccer team. She was named once to the All-Conference First Team and twice to the All-Conference Second Team in the Division-II California Collegiate Athletic Association.

Club career 
Holguín signed with Puerto Rico Sol in July 2018.

References

External links
 
 

1996 births
Living people
Citizens of Mexico through descent
Mexican women's footballers
Women's association football goalkeepers
FC Juárez footballers
Mexican expatriate women's footballers
Mexican expatriate sportspeople in Puerto Rico
Expatriate women's footballers in Puerto Rico
Soccer players from Los Angeles
People from Alhambra, California
American women's soccer players
College women's soccer players in the United States
San Francisco State Gators athletes
American expatriate women's soccer players
American sportspeople of Mexican descent